The Panasonic Lumix DMC-GM5 is a Micro Four Thirds rangefinder-styled digital mirrorless camera announced by Panasonic on September 15, 2014. 

The camera was designed to provide maximum image quality in the smallest possible body.

It is slightly larger than the earlier GM1, as it adds a flash hot shoe, an electronic viewfinder and a rear scroll-wheel for adjusting settings. However, with a body roughly the same size as a pack of playing cards, it is still extremely small for a system camera.

It has an image sensor size of 17.3 x 13.0mm, with a live MOS sensor. This is roughly a quarter the size of a full-frame sensor - resulting in a 2:1 crop-factor for lenses and a two-stop difference in terms of light-gathering.

The camera was discontinued in late 2015, and has not been replaced in the Panasonic lineup. It has attained a cult status, and is one of only a very few digital cameras to sell for higher prices second-hand than it did when new.

When sold new, it was usually bundled with a 12-32mm pancake kit lens or a double-lens kit including the 12-32mm and a 35-100mm telephoto zoom. A small 15mm f/1.7 prime lens was also produced to fit the camera. All three of these lenses are still available as of 2022.

References
http://www.dpreview.com/products/panasonic/slrs/panasonic_dmcgm5/specifications

GM5